The following is a list of episodes of the Discovery Kids' series Flight 29 Down which premiered on October 1, 2005 and ended on August 25, 2007. A total of 30 episodes were produced spanning 3 seasons.

Series overview

Episodes

Season 1 (2005–06)

Season 2 (2006–07)

Season 3 (2007)

External links
 
 

Lists of American children's television series episodes
Lists of American comedy-drama television series episodes
Lists of American teen comedy television series episodes
Lists of American teen drama television series episodes